Varioonops is a genus of goblin spiders that was first described by A. Bolzern & Norman I. Platnick in 2013.

Species
 it contains twenty-three species, found in Colombia, Venezuela, Panama, and Costa Rica:
Varioonops cafista Bolzern & Platnick, 2013 (type) – Costa Rica
Varioonops cerrado Bolzern & Platnick, 2013 – Panama
Varioonops chordio Bolzern & Platnick, 2013 – Venezuela
Varioonops edvardi Bolzern & Platnick, 2013 – Colombia
Varioonops funator Bolzern & Platnick, 2013 – Panama
Varioonops girven Bolzern & Platnick, 2013 – Costa Rica
Varioonops grancho Bolzern & Platnick, 2013 – Venezuela
Varioonops heredia Bolzern & Platnick, 2013 – Costa Rica
Varioonops montesta Bolzern & Platnick, 2013 – Costa Rica
Varioonops parlata Bolzern & Platnick, 2013 – Venezuela
Varioonops pittieri Bolzern & Platnick, 2013 – Venezuela
Varioonops poas Bolzern & Platnick, 2013 – Costa Rica
Varioonops potaguo Bolzern & Platnick, 2013 – Venezuela
Varioonops ramila Bolzern & Platnick, 2013 – Costa Rica, Panama
Varioonops sansidro Bolzern & Platnick, 2013 – Costa Rica, Panama
Varioonops sinesama Bolzern & Platnick, 2013 – Colombia
Varioonops spatharum Bolzern & Platnick, 2013 – Costa Rica
Varioonops tortuguero Bolzern & Platnick, 2013 – Costa Rica
Varioonops trujillo Bolzern & Platnick, 2013 – Venezuela
Varioonops varablanca Bolzern & Platnick, 2013 – Costa Rica
Varioonops velsala Bolzern & Platnick, 2013 – Costa Rica
Varioonops veragua Bolzern & Platnick, 2013 – Costa Rica
Varioonops yacambu Bolzern & Platnick, 2013 – Venezuela

See also
 List of Oonopidae species

References

Araneomorphae genera
Oonopidae
Spiders of Central America
Spiders of South America